Miss America 1926, the sixth Miss America pageant, was held at the Million Dollar Pier in Atlantic City, New Jersey on Friday, September 10, 1926. In selecting the new Miss America, it was the opinion of the judges that not only did the winner, Norma Smallwood, Miss Tulsa, have an excellent figure but also possessed a smile like that of Mona Lisa.

Smallwood was the first Miss America to also win the award for "the most beautiful girl in evening gown" at the highly promoted National Beauty Tournament held during pageant week of the twenties. She proved to be an enormously popular selection.

Upon victory, Smallwood, who was an art major at Oklahoma College for Women in her sophomore year, stated she "might leave school for a year" and looked at her tenure as Miss America from a financial standpoint. She became the poster girl for Meadows Washing Machines and Westinghouse Electric, in addition to many others. It was said she made approximately $100,000 during her year.

One of the finalists, Rosebud Blondell, became the successful Hollywood actress Joan Blondell.

Results

Other awards

Contestants

References

External links
 Miss America official website

1926
1926 in the United States
1926 in New Jersey
September 1926 events
Events in Atlantic City, New Jersey